Tranmere Rovers F.C. played the 1922–23 season in the Football League Third Division North. It was their second season of league football, and they finished 16th of 20. They reached the Fourth Qualifying Round of the FA Cup.

Football League

References 

Tranmere Rovers F.C. seasons